The 2017 JAG Metals 350 Driving Hurricane Harvey Relief was the 21st stock car race of the 2017 NASCAR Camping World Truck Series, the fifth race of the 2017 NASCAR Camping World Truck Series playoffs, the second race of the Round of 6, and the 19th iteration of the event. The race was held on Friday, November 3, 2017, in Fort Worth, Texas at Texas Motor Speedway, a  permanent quad-oval racetrack. The race took the scheduled 147 laps to complete. At race's end, Johnny Sauter, driving for GMS Racing, would control the last 13 laps of the race to win his 16th career NASCAR Camping World Truck Series win and his third of the season. To fill out the podium, Austin Cindric of Brad Keselowski Racing and Christopher Bell of Kyle Busch Motorsports would finish second and third, respectively.

Background 

Texas Motor Speedway is a speedway located in the northernmost portion of the U.S. city of Fort Worth, Texas – the portion located in Denton County, Texas. The track measures 1.5 miles (2.4 km) around and is banked 24 degrees in the turns, and is of the oval design, where the front straightaway juts outward slightly. The track layout is similar to Atlanta Motor Speedway and Charlotte Motor Speedway (formerly Lowe's Motor Speedway). The track is owned by Speedway Motorsports, Inc., the same company that owns Atlanta and Charlotte Motor Speedway, as well as the short-track Bristol Motor Speedway.

Entry list 

 (R) denotes rookie driver.
 (i) denotes driver who is ineligible for series driver points.

Practice

First practice 
The first practice session was held on Thursday, November 2, at 2:00 PM CST. The session would last for 55 minutes.

Second and final practice 
The final practice session, sometimes known as Happy Hour, was held on Thursday, November 2, at 2:00 PM CST. The session would last for 55 minutes.

Qualifying 
Qualifying was held on Friday, November 3, at 3:00 PM CST. Since Texas Motor Speedway is at least a  racetrack, the qualifying system was a single car, single lap, two round system where in the first round, everyone would set a time to determine positions 13–32. Then, the fastest 12 qualifiers would move on to the second round to determine positions 1–12.

No drivers would fail to qualify.

Full qualifying results 

*Time not available.

Race results 
Stage 1 Laps: 35

Stage 2 Laps: 35

Stage 3 Laps: 77

Standings after the race 

Drivers' Championship standings

Note: Only the first 8 positions are included for the driver standings.

References 

2017 NASCAR Camping World Truck Series
NASCAR races at Texas Motor Speedway
November 2017 sports events in the United States
2017 in sports in Texas